Mario Lega (born 10 January 1957) is a former Italian long jumper who was 10th in the long jump at the World Athletics Indoor Championships in 1985 and won two national championships at individual senior level.

Lega was also the Italian long jump record holder for one year.

National records
 Long jump: 7.95 m ( Salsomaggiore, 30 April 1980) - record holder until 11 April 1981.

Achievements

National titles
Lega won two national championships at individual senior level.
Italian Athletics Indoor Championships
Long jump: 1979, 1985 (2)

See also
 Men's long jump Italian record progression
 Italy at the World Athletics Indoor Championships

References

External links
 

1957 births
Living people
Italian male long jumpers
Sportspeople from Bologna
Athletics competitors of Fiamme Gialle